Sarel Johannes Pretorius (born 18 April 1984) is a South African rugby player who plays at scrum half for the  in the Pro14.

In 2010 and 2011 he played in every match. In the 2011 Super Rugby competition he equalled Bjorn Basson from the Bulls as the top tryscorer with nine tries. In 2008 he played for the Emerging Springboks and in 2009 he played for the Royal XV against the touring British and Irish Lions.

Pretorius signed for the Waratahs for two years starting in 2012.

In January 2015, Pretorius announced that he would join the Welsh regional team the Dragons at the end of the 2014–2015 season. He was released by the Dragons at the end of the 2017-18 season.

On 20 March 2018, Pretorius returns home to South Africa to join newly Pro14 side Southern Kings from the 2018-19 season.

External links
Dragons profile

References

Cheetahs (rugby union) players
Living people
White South African people
South African rugby union players
New South Wales Waratahs players
Griquas (rugby union) players
Free State Cheetahs players
Falcons (rugby union) players
Dragons RFC players
Rugby union scrum-halves
1984 births
South African expatriate rugby union players
Expatriate rugby union players in Australia
South African expatriate sportspeople in Australia
Rugby union players from Bloemfontein
Southern Kings players